Vasek Pospisil and Nenad Zimonjić were the defending champions, but Pospisil decided not to participate. Zimonjić plays alongside Marcin Matkowski but lost to Alexander Peya and Bruno Soares in the quarterfinals.

Peya and Soares went on to win the title, defeating Jamie Murray and John Peers in the final 7–5, 7–5

Seeds

Draw

Draw

Qualifying

Seeds

Qualifiers
 Treat Huey /  Henri Kontinen

Lucky losers
 Robin Haase /  Sergiy Stakhovsky

Qualifying draw

References
 Main Draw
 Qualifying Draw

Swiss Indoors - Doubles
2015 Davidoff Swiss Indoors